Coordinates of Confusion is the second album by Slovenian thrash metal band Negligence. It was released by Metal Blade Records on October 8, 2010, making Negligence the first Slovenian metal act to ever have a worldwide release by a foreign label.

Background
While recorded with the same line-up that featured on Options of a Trapped Mind three years earlier, the album marks the departure of Dyz, who left the band at the closing stages of finishing the album. The group toured in Poland, supporting Artillery on their eastern European leg of the tour and appeared on various festivals and gigs, opening for the likes of Megadeth, Lamb of God and other numerous bands.

Track listing

Personnel
Negligence
 Alex - lead vocals
 Jey - guitar
 Lipnik - bass guitar
 Ruzz - drums
 Dyz - guitar

Production
 Produced, Engineered and Mixed by Ruzz and Jey, Mastered by Alan Douches at West West Side Studios, New York.

References

2010 albums
Negligence (band) albums
Metal Blade Records albums
Albums recorded in Slovenia